|}

The Oaksey Chase is a Grade 2 National Hunt chase in Great Britain which is open to horses aged five years or older. 
It is run at Sandown Park over a distance of about 2 miles and 6½ furlongs (2 miles, 6 furlongs and 164 yards, or ), and it is scheduled to take place each year in April.

The race was first run in 2014 as a Listed race, and was raised to Grade 2 status in 2016. The title commemorates John Oaksey (1929 - 2012), an amateur jockey and journalist who rode the winner of the 1958 Whitbread Gold Cup at Sandown Park.

Records
Most successful horse (4 wins):
 Menorah – 2014, 2015, 2016, 2017

Leading jockey (4 wins):
 Richard Johnson – Menorah (2014, 2015, 2016, 2017)

Leading trainer (4 wins):
 Philip Hobbs – Menorah (2014, 2015, 2016, 2017)

Winners

See also
 Horse racing in Great Britain
 List of British National Hunt races

References 

Racing Post: 

National Hunt races in Great Britain
National Hunt chases
Sandown Park Racecourse
Recurring sporting events established in 2014
2014 establishments in England